The Saskatchewan River (Cree: kisiskāciwani-sīpiy, "swift flowing river") is a major river in Canada. It flows roughly eastward across Saskatchewan and Manitoba to empty into Lake Winnipeg. Through its tributaries the North Saskatchewan and South Saskatchewan, its watershed encompasses much of the prairie regions of Canada, stretching westward to the Rocky Mountains in Alberta and north-western Montana in the United States. 

Including its tributaries, it reaches  to its farthest headwaters on the Bow River, a tributary of the South Saskatchewan in Alberta.

Description 

Both source rivers originate from glaciers in the Alberta Rockies. The St. Mary River, draining the Hudson Bay Divide region of Glacier National Park (U.S.), also empties into the Saskatchewan River via the south fork.

The combined stream flows east-northeast, into Codette Lake formed by the Francois Finlay Dam at Nipawin then into Tobin Lake, formed by the E.B. Campbell Dam. It then flows northeast, passing through a region of marshes, where it is joined from the northwest by the Torch River and the Mossy River. At the northern edge of the marshes it flows east, twisting between a series of small lakes into west-central Manitoba to The Pas, where it is joined from the southwest by the Carrot River. The waters of Lake Winnipeg eventually drain into Hudson Bay, via the Nelson River.

The river, like the province of Saskatchewan, takes its name from the Cree word , meaning "swift flowing river". The river and its tributaries provided an important route of transportation for First Nations and early European trappers.

Hydroelectric developments

Operating hydroelectric facilities 
In Saskatchewan, SaskPower owns and operates E.B. Campbell (289 MW, formerly Squaw Rapids) and Nipawin (255 MW) Hydroelectric Stations.

In Manitoba, Manitoba Hydro owns and operates Grand Rapids Generating Station.

Proposed hydroelectric facilities 
It would consist of four 150 MW generating units, providing 300 MW of baseload power, and an additional 300 MW of peaking power.

In 2019, James Smith Cree Nation began developing the project with AECOM and Tesla Energy.

Fish species
Fish species include: walleye, sauger, yellow perch, northern pike, lake whitefish, mooneye, goldeye, white sucker, longnose sucker, shorthead redhorse, burbot, rainbow trout, brown trout, and lake sturgeon. In 2008 the presence of reproducing Prussian carp were found in the Red Deer River drainage basin which flows into the Saskatchewan River. Illegal introductions of non native species can have serious wide-ranging negative impacts on the ecosystem. While the exact species is not yet determined the genus is Carassius. The Blue Ribbon Bow River Trout fishery may be at risk as a result of this introduction. Illegal introductions of Carassius can be very harmful.

History
The river, labeled as the "Kish-stock-ewen" is identified on a Hudson's Bay Company map of 1760, produced from oral information from a First Nations man named Attickasish who had been Anthony Henday's guide.  Another map from 1774 shows a fairly accurate course of the river.

The Saskatchewan River and its two major tributaries formed an important transportation route during the precontact, fur trade, and early settlement periods in the Canadian West. In early fur trading days the South Saskatchewan tributary was known as "La Fourche des Gros Ventres" ("Fork of the Great Gorges") and the North Saskatchewan was known as "Rivière du Pas".

First Nations inhabiting the area of the rivers included at one time or another the Atsina, Cree, Saulteaux, Blackfoot Confederacy, Assiniboine, and Sioux.

Henry Kelsey penetrated the area in the 1690s for the Hudson's Bay Company, and Louis de la Corne, Chevalier de la Corne, established the farthest western post of the French Empire in America (See New France) just east of the Saskatchewan River Forks at Fort de la Corne. In addition to this the Hudson's Bay Company and North West Company both ran numerous fur posts up the river and its two branches throughout the late 18th to late 19th centuries. York boats and canoes formed the primary means of travel during the fur trade period.

In the mid-19th century Metis settlements became important along stretches of the Saskatchewan river system, notably at the Southbranch Settlement, Prince Albert, Saskatchewan, and St. Albert, Alberta.

Riverboats were introduced from the Red River of the North in the 19th century and remained an important means of transportation until the 1890s and the coming of railways to the area.

The earliest settlements in Saskatchewan and Alberta generally were established around the rivers. Examples include Fort Edmonton (Edmonton, Alberta), Fort Battleford (Battleford, Saskatchewan), Prince Albert, Saskatchewan, and Cumberland House, Saskatchewan.

Fur trade on the lower river: The first European to ascend the river as far as the forks was Louis-Joseph Gaultier de La Vérendrye in spring 1739. The main posts on the river were (landmarks in parentheses): (Saskatchewan River Forks) Fort La Jonquière (?), Fort de la Corne, Cumberland House, Saskatchewan, (The Pas):second Fort Paskoya, (inflow to Cedar Lake:) first Fort Paskoya and second Fort Bourbon, (Cedar Lake), (inflow to Lake Winnipeg:) Grand Rapids, Manitoba, and first Fort Bourbon. There were also a number of temporary posts that have left few records. By far the most important post was Cumberland House which was the depot for the route northwest to the rich Athabasca country. To the west, the North Saskatchewan had the greatest number of posts. North Saskatchewan is the northern-most major river of the western prairies that flows into the Hudson Bay.

In popular culture 
The Saskatchewan River, and its two main tributaries, are featured in The Arrogant Worms' song "The Last Saskatchewan Pirate".

See also 
 List of longest rivers of Canada
 List of rivers of Manitoba
 List of rivers of Saskatchewan
 List of rivers of Alberta
 Manitoba Hydro
 Watershed management
 Saskatchewan River Delta
 Saskatchewan River fur trade

Further reading 
Myrna Kostash, "Reading the River: A Traveller's Companion to the North Saskatchewan River",2005

References

External links 
Saskatchewan and its people Volume 1 (Steamboating in the old days)
 Canadian Council for Geographic Education page with a series of articles on the history of the Saskatchewan River.
 Partners FOR the Saskatchewan River Basin
 Encyclopedia of Saskatchewan

 
Rivers of Saskatchewan
Rivers of Manitoba
Tributaries of Hudson Bay